Aleksandr Sergeevich Ustyugov (born 17 October 1976) is a Russian actor, film director and musician. He is best known for his role as a main character Roman Shilov for 60 episodes of Cop Wars (TV mini-series) between 2005-2010 (ru), also as Victor Toropov in the 2019 Netflix TV series Better than Us.

Early life

Aleksandr Ustyugov was born in the city of Ekibastuz, Pavlodar Region, Kazakh SSR, Soviet Union (now Kazakhstan), to a Russian family.
After graduating from Ekibastuz secondary school No. 15, he entered vocational school No. 18, specialising in "Electrical Repair, Installation and Dismantling of Mining Equipment". 
He graduated from vocational school with honours, while working on the Vostochny Coal Mine.

Aleksandr studied at art school for five years between 1988–1993 and during this time practised boxing at the Sports School Zhasyby.

Acting career
Aleksandr Ustyugov continued his education in Omsk, where in 1993 he entered the Omsk State Transport University with a degree in "Carriage Engineering".
He studied there for full-time for three semesters, before transferring to the Omsk Youth Theatre as an illuminator, before joining the theater's troupe. Omsk audience remembered the brilliant performance of the role of the Spider in the ballet extravaganza in verses from the life of insects Fly-Tsokotuha directed by Boris Krichmar.

In 1996 Aleksandr entered the Omsk Regional College of Culture and Art (at OmTUZ), then in 1999 attended the  Boris Shchukin Theatre Institute for a further 3 years. After graduating from it, he moved to Moscow, where in 1999 he entered the Higher Theater School named after B.V. Schukin (course of Rodion Yurievich Ovchinnikov).

He made many appearance in theatre productions before landing his first movie role in the 2002 film The Star.

In 2003, upon graduation, he was invited to the troupe of the Russian Academic Youth Theater (RAMT) in Moscow, where he served until 2014. In 2014 Aleksandr moved to live in Saint Petersburg. 
 
In 2018, Ustyugov was nominated for the TEFI Award in the category "Best Actor in a TV Series" for his lead role in the TV series "The Golden Horde". In 2019, Ustyugov played the main villainous character Victor Toropov in 16 episodes of the Netflix TV series Better than Us

Personal life 
In August 2005, Aleksandr married actress Yanina Sokolovskaya, with whom he studied together on the same course at the Shchukin Theater School. In 2007, they had a daughter, Yevgeniya, and in 2015 the marriage broke up. 
In September 2015, Aleksandr married the daughter of a famous businessman, Anna Ozar, but three months later the marriage broke up.

Ekibastuz Group 
In 2015, Ustyugov created his own musical group called “Ekibastuz”. The group performs in the genre of St. Petersburg Rock. The band peeked on January 19, 2017 in the concert hall "Coliseum" in St. Petersburg, for the presentation of the debut album "Roads” written by Ustyugov who was also lead vocals.

Honours 
In 2017 Aleksandr was awarded the title “Honorary Citizen of Ekibastuz” was awarded for his contribution to the socio-economic development of the Ekibastuz region.

Filmography

Film

Television

References

External links

 
 Alexander Ustyugov on the VKontakte social network

1976 births
Living people
People from Pavlodar Region
Russian male actors
21st-century Russian male actors
Russian male film actors
Russian male television actors
Russian male stage actors
Russian theatre directors
Russian film directors